Phoxocampus diacanthus, also known as the obscure pipefish or spined pipefish, is a species of marine fish belonging to the family Sygnathidae. It can be found inhabiting reefs throughout the Indo-Pacific from Japan and Sri Lanka to Samoa and New Caledonia in the south.  Its diet likely consists of small crustaceans. Reproduction occurs through ovoviviparity in which the males brood eggs before giving live birth.

References

External links 

 Phoxocampus diacanthus at FishBase
 Phoxocampus diacanthus at Fishes of Australia

Syngnathidae
Fish described in 1943
Fauna of Japan